Hurricane Octave was a Category 4 hurricane whose remnants brought notable rainfall to Southern California. Octave was the nineteenth tropical cyclone, sixteenth named storm, eighth hurricane, and third major hurricane of the above-average 1989 Pacific hurricane season. Octave originated from the remnants of Atlantic Tropical Depression Nine, which tracked westward across the Caribbean and entered the Pacific Ocean on September 3. It slowly developed, and organized into a tropical depression on September 8. It strengthened into a tropical storm on September 10, thus earning the name Octave. After strengthening into a hurricane the next day, Octave started to steadily intensify en route to a peak as a Category 4 hurricane of the Saffir–Simpson hurricane scale. The hurricane weakened into a tropical storm on September 14, and degenerated further into a tropical depression the next day, before dissipating on September 16. The remnants of the storm brought moderate rainfall to parts of California and Arizona, as well as three F0 tornadoes.

Meteorological history

Hurricane Octave originated from a tropical wave that left west coast of Africa on August 21, 1989. Moving westward, the wave became better organized and developed into Atlantic Tropical Depression Nine on August 27. However, strong wind shear inhibited further development of the system, leading to it degenerating to a tropical wave. Continuing westward, the system moved through the Caribbean without significant development before crossing Central America and entering the Pacific Ocean on September 3. Upon becoming a tropical cyclone, the convection became well-organized. Octave took a general northwestward track as it intensified, becoming Tropical Storm Octave later that day.

Upon being named, Octave had developed a good outflow and shear was decreasing, leading to forecasters at the National Hurricane Center anticipating the storm to become a hurricane. The storm slowly strengthened over the following two days, becoming a strong tropical storm early on September 11. Octave later reached hurricane intensity late on September 11. as it developed an eye. Meanwhile, Octave was being steered by an anticyclone over Mexico and a trough to the west allowed the hurricane to continue northwest. Continuing to intensify, it was soon upgraded to Category 2 status on the Saffir–Simpson hurricane scale. During the afternoon of September 13, Octave intensified into a major hurricane, a storm with sustained winds of at least . Early the next day, the hurricane attained peak intensity as Category 4 hurricane, based on the Dvorak technique, a tool used to estimate tropical cyclone intensity. At this time, maximum winds were estimated at  along with a barometric pressure of 94.8 kPa (27.99 inHg).

By the end of the September 13, the eye of Octave had become less defined as the hurricane weakened. Steady weakening took place as the storm continued a northwesterly track due to a trough. By September 14, Octave was downgraded into a tropical storm as winds dropped below  The system began to weaken rapidly as it turned towards the west, and it was downgraded to a tropical depression late on September 15. After turning back towards the east, Octave rapidly dissipated on September 16 as steering current diminished.

Preparations and impact
Prior to the arrival of Octave, the NHC issued public advisories. The advisories noted that  of rain was possible in the higher elevations. The possibility of a dissipating prior to landfall was also noted. Octave came within  of Socorro Island. In addition, its remnants did move into California. Sacramento also recorded  in 6 hours. Light rainfall was reported throughout southern California, with enough falling in Los Angeles to make streets slippery. Moisture associated with Octave produced isolated showers in thunderstorms in parts of southern Arizona on September 16. In addition, a power outage in Lodi, California affected 7,000 customers. Octave also produced minor damage to the grape and raisin crops.

See also

List of California hurricanes
List of Pacific hurricanes
List of Category 4 Pacific hurricanes

References

1989 Pacific hurricane season
Category 4 Pacific hurricanes